An odontogenic tumor is a neoplasm of the cells or tissues that initiate odontogenic processes.

Examples include:

 Adenomatoid odontogenic tumor
 Ameloblastic fibroma
 Ameloblastic fibro-odontoma
 Ameloblastoma, a type of odontogenic tumor involving ameloblasts
Ameloblastic fibrosarcoma
 Calcifying cystic odontogenic tumor
 Calcifying epithelial odontogenic tumor
 Cementoblastoma
 Cementoma
Odontogenic keratocyst
 Odontogenic carcinoma
 Odontogenic myxoma
 Odontoma
 Squamous odontogenic tumour

References

External links 

Anatomical pathology
Main